The Furggenspitz is a mountain in the Bernese Alps, overlooking Feutersoey in the Bernese Oberland.

References

External links
 Furggenspitz on Hikr

Mountains of the Alps
Mountains of Switzerland
Mountains of the canton of Bern
Two-thousanders of Switzerland